Kawal Tiger Reserve is a nature preserve located at Jannaram mandal of Mancherial District (Old Adilabad district) in the Telangana state of India. The government of India declared Kawal Wildlife Sanctuary to be a Tiger Reserve in 2012. The reserve is the oldest sanctuary in the northern Telangana region of the state. It is well known for its abundant flora and fauna. This sanctuary is catchment for the rivers Godavari and Kadam, which flow towards the south of the sanctuary.

History 
The KWS was established in 1965 and later declared as a Protected Area (PA) in 1999 under the WPA, 1972.

Tiger reserve status
It was listed as a tiger reserve in April 2012. Due to this status, it was developed as a tiger habitat with the release of 150 cheetals as a prey population. To reduce poaching, new checkposts have been created. Traditional sources of water were improved.

Location
Mancherial district is situated between 18.8756° N, 79.4591° E. It is surrounded by Adilabad and Komuram Bheem on the north, Karimnagar and Nizamabad on the south and Nanded district on the west. It extended from the Sahyadri hillranges to the Tadoba forest in Maharashtra (GoAP2012; Rajagopal 1976)
It is increasingly getting threatened by growing human encroachment, rampant poaching, illegal wood felling and habitat loss.

The reserve is accessible from Mancherial  and from Hyderabad  by road. The nearest airport is in Hyderabad.

Wildlife

Flora 
The sanctuary is one of the richest teak forests in the state, with dense pristine areas free of human disturbance. The River Godavari flows through this area. Dry deciduous teak forests mixed with bamboo, terminalia, pterocarpus, anogeissus and cassias.

Fauna 
Mammal species that have been sighted include tiger, leopard, gaur, cheetal, sambar, nilgai, barking deer, chowsingha, and sloth bear. Several species of birds and reptiles are also found in the sanctuary.

About 48 tigers are currently staying at the sanctuary, according to unofficial government sources, a number which the government hopes will increase over time.

References

Tiger Reserve in Kawal Wildlife Sanctuary: Issues and Concerns by Bikku Rathod and M Rambabu published in 
International Journal of Innovative Research and Practices Vol.1, Issue 1, January 2013ISSN 2321-2926

External links

 Official website
 Forest Department of Telangana (India) State Government website

Eastern Highlands moist deciduous forests
Wildlife sanctuaries of Telangana
Protected areas established in 1965
1965 establishments in Andhra Pradesh